Mississippi Highway 302 (MS 302), also known as Goodman Road, is the main east-west highway in DeSoto County, Mississippi, extending into Marshall County to the east.

Route description

MS 302, along with Goodman Road, begins at the northern edge of the Mississippi Delta region in DeSoto County in the town of Walls at an intersection with MS 161. It heads due east as a four-lane divided highway to have an interchange with US 61 before leaving Walls, climbing out of the Delta, and narrowing to an undivided four-lane as it passes through the neighboring community of Lynchburg, where it has an intersection with MS 301. The highway now enters the city of Horn Lake and travels through suburban areas, as well as the city's main business district, before having an interchange with Interstate 55 (I-55) and I-69 (exit 289), where the highway crosses into neighboring Southaven. MS 302 travels a large business district, then suburbs, for a few miles before crossing into neighboring Olive Branch and having an interchange with US 78 (exit 2) and becoming an expressway. The highway immediately splits from Goodman Road as it bypasses downtown along its northern side, where it has a rather large interchange serving both MS 305 and MS 178, before rejoining Goodman Road to leave the city of Olive Branch, passing through the small community of Handy Corner before crossing into Marshall County.

MS 302 now travels through rural farmland for the next several miles as it passes through the communities of Barton, where it has an intersection with MS 309, and Cayce, where it has an interchange with I-269/MS 304 (exit 23), before coming to an end at an interchange with US 72 at the very western edge of the community of Mount Pleasant.

The entire length of Mississippi Highway 302 is at least four lanes wide.

Major intersections

See also

References

External links

302
Transportation in DeSoto County, Mississippi
Transportation in Marshall County, Mississippi